Carr v. Saul, 593 U.S. ___ (2021), was a decision of the United States Supreme Court concerning the Appointments Clause.

References

External links 
 

2021 in United States case law
Appointments Clause case law
United States administrative case law
United States separation of powers case law
United States Supreme Court cases
United States Supreme Court cases of the Roberts Court